Edwin Daniel Bellorín Morales (born February 21, 1982 in San Félix, Venezuela) is a former catcher.

Career
Bellorín was signed by the Los Angeles Dodgers on September 10, 1998, as an undrafted free agent. He spent six years in the Dodgers minor league system, never playing more than 100 games in a season. He declared free agency on October 15, 2006, and would later sign with the Colorado Rockies for the 2007 season. He began the year with the Colorado Springs Sky Sox, the Rockies Triple-A affiliate. On August 6, 2007, he had his contract purchased by the big league club. He replaced struggling catcher Chris Ianetta on the Rockies' active roster.

On August 7, 2007, Bellorín played in his first MLB game, which was an 11–4 Rockies home win over the Milwaukee Brewers.  He made one plate appearance, hitting into a double play, then injured his hamstring running to first base. He was placed on the disabled list afterwards.

On September 24, 2008, Bellorín recorded his first MLB hit, an infield single, off Billy Sadler in the top of the seventh inning of a Rockies 15–6 road victory over the San Francisco Giants.

Bellorín re-signed with the Rockies on January 14, .

He was declared a minor league free agent on October 16, .

The Royals have traded minor league catcher Edwin Bellorin to the Astros for cash considerations, tweets Bob Dutton of the Kansas City Star.  The club promoted backstop Manuel Pina from Double-A to the club's Triple-A affiliate in his place.

After spending the first six years of his professional career in the Dodgers' farm system, Bellorin was with the Rockies' Triple-A affiliate from 2007 through 2009.  During that span he made eight big league appearances with the club.  With Triple-A Omaha in 2010, the 28-year-old hit just .162/.231/.185.
Bellorin signed with the Wichita Wingnuts in the 2010 off-season after being released by the Houston Astros.

See also
 List of Major League Baseball players from Venezuela

References

External links

Bellorin lands on DL
http://www.mlbtraderumors.com/2010/07/royals-trade-edwin-bellorin-to-astros.html

1982 births
Living people
Colorado Rockies players
Colorado Springs Sky Sox players
Gulf Coast Dodgers players
Jacksonville Suns players
Las Vegas 51s players
Major League Baseball catchers
Major League Baseball players from Venezuela
Omaha Royals players
People from Ciudad Guayana
Round Rock Express players
South Georgia Waves players
Tiburones de La Guaira players
Venezuelan expatriate baseball players in the United States
Vero Beach Dodgers players
Wichita Wingnuts players